Yves Allegro and Horia Tecău, who were the winners in 2008, chose to not compete this year.
Michael Kohlmann and Alexander Peya became the new champions, by defeating Philipp Marx and Igor Zelenay 6–4, 7–6(4) in the final.

Seeds

Draw

Draw

References
 Doubles Draw

Bauer Watertechnology Cup - Doubles
2009 Doubles